The Church of Santiago (Spanish: Iglesia de Santiago) is a church located in Jerez de la Frontera, Spain. It was declared Bien de Interés Cultural in 1931.

Location 
Near Santiago square, the church is built outside the enclosure walled of the medieval city. In the place where there was a chapel with the same name built in times of the Spanish reconquest.

Host 
The church is hosts two associations (Hermandades):

 Hermandad del Prendimiento
 Hermandad del Rosario de Capataces y Costaleros.

See also 
 List of Bien de Interés Cultural in the Province of Cádiz

References 

Bien de Interés Cultural landmarks in the Province of Cádiz